The Xanthomonadales are a bacterial order within the Gammaproteobacteria. They are one of the largest groups of bacterial phytopathogens, harbouring species such as Xanthomonas citri, Xanthomonas euvesicatoria, Xanthomonas oryzae and Xylella fastidiosa. These bacteria affect agriculturally important plants including tomatoes, bananas, citrus plants, rice, and coffee. Many species within the order are also human pathogens. Species within the genus Stenotrophomonas are multidrug resistant opportunistic pathogens that are responsible for nosocomial infections in immunodeficient patients.

Characteristics
The Xanthomonadales are gram-negative, catalase positive, non-spore forming obligate aerobes. Members belonging to the order are straight rods lacking prosthecae. While some members are non-motile, other species within the order are motile by means of flagella. Stenotrophomonas is the only genus capable of nitrate reduction within the Xanthomonadales.

Taxonomy 
The Xanthomonadales consist of 28 validly named genera among two families: Xanthomonadaceae and Rhodanobacteraceae. The Xanthomonadaceae consists of 13 genera while the Rhodanobacteraceae consist of 14 genera. The families can be distinguished from one another on the basis of conserved signature indels found among a variety of proteins, specific for each family. These indels are in parallel with phylogenomic analysis that reveal two distinct clades that appear to be evolutionarily divergent. 
Lysobacterales and Lysobacteraceae are earlier synonyms of Xanthomonadales and Xanthomonadaceae, respectively.

Phylogenetic position
The Xanthomonadales are early divergents of bacteria within the Gammaproteobacteria, and are often used to root phylogenetic trees created for the class. Until recently, the Xanthomonodales order was inclusive of the families Xanthomonadaceae, Algiphilaceae, Solimonadaceae, Nevskiaceae and Sinobacteraceae. However, no molecular signatures were found that were inclusive of all families. The organisms were taxonomically rearranged such that Xanthomonadales included Xanthomonadaceae, which was later divided into two families. The division was in accordance with CSIs that were found specifically for all members of the emended Xanthomonadales order, providing support for the currently accepted taxonomy. All other species were transferred to Nevskiales, which did not share CSIs with Xanthomonadales, but remain close relatives within the Gammaproteobacteria. Cardiobacteriales, Chromatiales, Methylococcales, Legionellales and Thiotrichales are also deep branching orders that are phylogenetic neighbours of Xanthomonadales and Nevskiales members. The order Nevskiales harbors a single family (Salinisphaeraceae) and six  genera: Alkanibacter, Fontimonas, Hydrocarboniphaga, Nevskia, Solimonas and Steroidobacter.
Wohlfahrtiimonas chitiniclastica and Ignatzschineria larvae are two species that have historically been accepted as members of the family Xanthomonadaceae. However, they do not share conserved signatures with the family, or with the Xanthomonodales order. These species form deep branching within neighbouring Gammaproteobacteria, and are monophyletic with Cardiobacteriales members. These species are thus currently labelled as incertae sedis.

Phylogeny
The currently accepted taxonomy is based on the National Center for Biotechnology Information (NCBI). 
Rhodanobacteraceae 
Gynumella 
Aquimonas 
Chiayiivigra 
Megamonas 
Dokdonella 
Dyella 
Frateuria 
Fulvimonas 
Luteibacter 
Metallibacterium 
Mizugakiibacter
Oleiagrimonas 
Pseudofulvimonas 
Rhodanobacter 
Rudaea 
Tahibacter
Xanthomonadaceae 
Arenimonas 
Denitratimonas 
Kaistibacter 
Luteimonas 
Lysobacter 
Pseudoxanthomonas 
Rehaibacterium 
Silanimonas 
Stenotrophomonas 
Thermomonas 
Vulcaniibacterium 
Xanthomonas 
Xylella

References

 
Gammaproteobacteria